Clenchwarton railway station is a former station in Clenchwarton, Norfolk. It was part of the Midland and Great Northern Joint Railway line from the Midlands to Great Yarmouth.

References

Disused railway stations in Norfolk
Former Midland and Great Northern Joint Railway stations
Railway stations in Great Britain opened in 1866
Railway stations in Great Britain closed in 1959
1866 establishments in England